Beyond the Mountains is a play by Kenneth Rexroth that was staged by The Living Theatre.

References 

 
 
 
 
 
 
 
 
 

American plays